Antton Luengo Celaya (born January 17, 1981) is a Spanish former professional road bicycle racer who competed professionally between 2004 and 2008 for the  team.

Major results

2003
 1st Overall Bidasoa Itzulia
1st Stage 4a
2006
 6th Subida a Urkiola

External links 
Profile at Euskaltel-Euskadi official website 

Cyclists from the Basque Country (autonomous community)
Spanish male cyclists
1981 births
Living people
People from Busturialdea
Sportspeople from Biscay